Tau Devi Lal Stadium is a multi-sport complex in located in Sector 3, Panchkula, a satellite town in the outskirts of Chandigarh. The stadium is capable of holding around 7000 spectators and came into picture because of the Indian Cricket League's inaugural Twenty20 tournament.  The stadium has been leased by Government of Haryana and has got facilities to hold day-night matches.  The outfield is rough and patchy and the pitch is an untested one.   The stadium has practice facilities including four batting nets behind the ground all containing concrete pitches to bat on. The ground is yet to host first-class matches but was one of three venues that was used by Indian Cricket League along with Sardar Vallabhbhai Patel Stadium in Ahmedabad and Lal Bahadur Shastri Stadium in Hyderabad

See also 

 Sector 16 Stadium
 Punjab Cricket Association IS Bindra Stadium
 Mullanpur International Cricket Stadium

References

External links 
 cricketarchive
 cricinfo
 

 
Sports venues in Chandigarh
Cricket grounds in Haryana
Sports venues completed in 2007
2007 establishments in Haryana
Indian Cricket League stadiums